André Luiz Oliveira is a Paralympian athlete from Brazil competing mainly in category F44 long jump and T44 sprint events.

Andre Luiz competed at the 2008 Summer Paralympics in Beijing.  He won a silver medal in theT42-46 4 × 100 m as part of the Brazilian team, after failing to medal in either the T44 100m or F42/44 long jump.

References

 profile on paralympic.org

External links
 

1970s births
Living people
Paralympic athletes of Brazil
Paralympic silver medalists for Brazil
Paralympic medalists in athletics (track and field)
Athletes (track and field) at the 2008 Summer Paralympics
Medalists at the 2008 Summer Paralympics
Brazilian male sprinters
Brazilian male long jumpers
Athletes from São Paulo
20th-century Brazilian people
21st-century Brazilian people